Lucas Dupont (born 19 March 1990) is a French rugby union player. His position is Wing and he currently plays for FC  Grenoble in the Rugby Pro D2.

References

1990 births
Living people
French rugby union players
People from Échirolles
FC Grenoble players
Montpellier Hérault Rugby players
Rugby union wings
Sportspeople from Isère